Iskuqucha (Quechua isku lime, qucha lake, "lime lake", Hispanicized spelling Izcucocha) is an archaeological site in Peru. It is located in the Junín Region, Yauli Province, La Oroya District. The site was declared  a National Cultural Heritage by Resolución Viceministerial No. 0099-2010-VMPCIC-MC on November 11, 2010.

References 

Archaeological sites in Peru
Archaeological sites in Junín Region